Marvel Comics is an American comic book company dating to 1961. This is a list of the publications it has released in its history under the "Marvel Comics" imprint. The list does not include collected editions; trade paperbacks; digital comics; free, promotional giveaways; sketchbooks; poster books or magazines, nor does it include series published by other Marvel imprints such as Epic, Icon or Star. It also does not include titles published by Marvel's pre-1961 predecessors Timely Comics and Atlas Comics.

List of Marvel Comics publications (A)
List of Marvel Comics publications (B–C)
List of Marvel Comics publications (D–E)
List of Marvel Comics publications (F–G)
List of Marvel Comics publications (H–L)
List of Marvel Comics publications (M)
List of Marvel Comics publications (N–R)
List of Marvel Comics publications (S)
List of Marvel Comics publications (T–V)

W

X

Y

Z

See also
List of Timely and Atlas Comics publications
List of first appearances in Marvel Comics publications
List of X-Men comics

For the titles from other Marvel imprints, see the following articles:
 Epic Comics
 Icon Comics
 Marvel Music
 Marvel UK - List of Marvel UK publications
 Razorline
 Star Comics

References

External links

Marvel Comics at the Big Comic Book DataBase

The Unofficial Handbook of Marvel Comics Creators by Paulo and Markus, a web site whose goal is "to list all comics [issues] ever published by Marvel Comics."

 W